Lyophyllum konradium is a species of mushroom-forming fungus in the family Lyophyllaceae.

Morphology 
Lyophyllum konradium is distinguished from other members of Lyophyllum by the presence of well-differentiated hymenial cystidia.

Molecular phylogenetics 
While the species has been treated as a member of the polyphyletic genus Lyophyllum,  molecular phylogenies have placed L. konradium in a distant clade from other members of the genus. This phylogenetic isolation has led some authors to recommend the creation of a new genus, which would include L. konradium and three additional unidentified species that placed near L. konradium in the most recent phylogenetic analysis by Bellanger et al. (2015).

References 

Lyophyllaceae
Fungi described in 1948